Espedalen Church is a parish church of the Church of Norway in Sør-Fron Municipality in Innlandet county, Norway. It is located in the Espedalen valley, at Verksodden. It is one of the churches for the Sør-Fron parish which is part of the Sør-Gudbrandsdal prosti (deanery) in the Diocese of Hamar. The brown, wooden church was built in a long church design in 1974 using plans drawn up by the architect Bjarne Bystad Ellefsen. The church seats about 130 people.

See also
List of churches in Hamar

References

Sør-Fron
Churches in Innlandet
Long churches in Norway
Wooden churches in Norway
20th-century Church of Norway church buildings
Churches completed in 1974
1974 establishments in Norway